is a subway station in the Tokyo Metro network. It is located in Kita, Tokyo.

Lines 
Tokyo Metro Namboku Line (station number N-17)

Platforms
The platforms are configured as two side platforms.

History 
Oji-kamiya Station opened on 29 November 1991.

The station facilities were inherited by Tokyo Metro after the privatization of the Teito Rapid Transit Authority (TRTA) in 2004.

References

External links
 Oji-kamiya Station Information (Tokyo Metro)

Railway stations in Tokyo
Railway stations in Japan opened in 1991
Tokyo Metro Namboku Line